General elections were held in the Faroe Islands on 24 August 1943. The People's Party emerged as the largest party in the Løgting, winning 12 of the 25 seats.

Results

References

Elections in the Faroe Islands
Faroe Islands
1943 in the Faroe Islands
August 1943 events
Election and referendum articles with incomplete results